Mandera South is a constituency in Mandera County, Kenya. It is one of six constituencies in Mandera County.

1. Elwak North ward

County  Assembly Ward Description: ward Number 0209, 
Comprises Bula afya and Wante Locations of Mandera County.

Member parliament for Mandera south 

Hon.Mohamed Adan Huka 2013-2017.

County Members of Assembly: Hon. Adan Maalim Mohamed (ADAN DYE) (2017-20)2. Elwak South ward3. Wargadud ward4. Shimbir Fatuma ward5. Kutulo ward'''

Government
The current Deputy County Commissioner is Daniel Bundotich.

References

Constituencies in Mandera County
Constituencies in North Eastern Province (Kenya)